Amy Adams (born 1974) is an American actress.

Amy Adams may also refer to:

Amy Adams (politician) (born 1971), New Zealand politician
A. Elizabeth Adams or Amy Elizabeth Adams (1892–1962), American zoologist
Amy Adams Strunk (born 1955), American businesswoman, controlling owner of the Tennessee Titans
Amy Adams (born 1979), American singer who was a finalist on the third season of American Idol
Amy Adams, founder of Adams Childrenswear
Amy Adams or Amy Games, wife of Lord Chief Justice John Popham